Marey may refer to:

People
 Étienne-Jules Marey (1830–1904), French scientist, pioneer of photography and cinema
 Amr Marey, Egyptian footballer

Places
 Marey, Vosges, a commune in the Vosges département in France
 Marey-sur-Tille, a commune in the Côte-d'Or department 
 Marey-lès-Fussey, a commune in the Côte-d'Or department

Other uses
 "The Peasant Marey", an 1876 short story by Fyodor Dostoevsky